Charles Mayo may refer to:
Charles Horace Mayo (1865–1939), American physician
Charles Herbert Mayo (1845–1929), English antiquarian
Charles William Mayo (1898–1968), American surgeon
Charles Mayo (cricketer) (1903–1943), Canadian-born English cricketer
Charles Mayo (Anglo-Saxon scholar) (1767–1858), Rawlinson and Bosworth Professor of Anglo-Saxon at the University of Oxford
Charles Mayo (golfer), English professional golfer